Auglaize County is a county in Northwestern Ohio, United States. As of the 2020 census, the population was 46,442. Its county seat and largest city is Wapakoneta.

Auglaize County comprises the Wapakoneta Micropolitan Statistical Area, which is also included in the Lima-Van Wert-Celina Combined Statistical Area.

Etymology
The county is named for the Auglaize River. Some sources say it is a corruption of the French description of the clay (glaise) water (eau); others say it comes from a Native American word for fallen timbers. Another remote possibility is that it derives from the French glace [*aux glaces?], meaning "mirror" or "ice" ['at the ices'?].

There is something to be said for the unattested eau glaise ("clay water"), like the attested terre glaise ("clay soil"), but Ramsey and Stewart agree that Auglaize (and variants, implying "*aux glaises") is American French for "at the lick(s)", literally "at the clays", where wild beasts came to lick salt and minerals from the soil, filling the lacuna in standard French for a salt lick. The spelling "glaize" is archaic (as in Cotgrave's French-English dictionary of 1611). In addition, in Arkansas there is a creek and mountain Glazypeau, from French glaise à Paul ("Paul's lick"). The assumed indigenous American (Algonquian) "fallen timbers" or "overgrown with brush" has no support without any attested etymons supplied and would not match phonetically in the case of Shawnee.

Geography
It is Ohio's second-smallest county by area.

The county is crossed by the Auglaize River and the Miami and Erie Canal. The headwaters of the Saint Marys River, the Great Miami River and the Scioto River as well as parts of Grand Lake St. Marys and Lake Loramie are in the county.

Adjacent counties
Allen County - north
Hardin County - east
Logan County - southeast
Shelby County - south
Mercer County - west
Van Wert County - northwest

Demographics

2000 census
As of the census of 2000, there were 46,611 people, 17,376 households, and 12,771 families residing in the county. The population density was 116 people per square mile (45/km2). There were 18,470 housing units at an average density of 46 per square mile (18/km2). The racial makeup of the county was 98.12% White, 0.24% Black or African American, 0.18% Native American, 0.41% Asian, 0.03% Pacific Islander, 0.20% from other races, and 0.83% from two or more races. 0.67% of the population were Hispanic or Latino of any race. 59.5% were of German, 10.9% American, 6.9% Irish and 6.3% English ancestry according to Census 2000. 97.9% spoke English and 1.2% Spanish as their first language.

There were 17,376 households, out of which 35.30% had children under the age of 18 living with them, 62.10% were married couples living together, 7.80% had a female householder with no husband present, and 26.50% were non-families. 23.30% of all households were made up of individuals, and 10.50% had someone living alone who was 65 years of age or older. The average household size was 2.62 and the average family size was 3.11.

In the county, the population was spread out, with 27.60% under the age of 18, 7.80% from 18 to 24, 28.20% from 25 to 44, 22.00% from 45 to 64, and 14.40% who were 65 years of age or older. The median age was 36 years. For every 100 females, there were 96.50 males. For every 100 females age 18 and over, there were 93.10 males.

The median income for a household in the county was $43,367, and the median income for a family was $50,024. Males had a median income of $37,024 versus $23,809 for females. The per capita income for the county was $19,593. About 4.90% of families and 6.20% of the population were below the poverty line, including 7.20% of those under age 18 and 6.40% of those age 65 or over.

2010 census
As of the 2010 United States Census, there were 45,949 people, 17,972 households, and 12,749 families residing in the county. The racial makeup of the county was 97.8% white, 0.4% Asian, 0.3% black or African American, 0.2% American Indian, 0.3% from other races, and 0.9% from two or more races. Those of Hispanic or Latino origin made up 1.2% of the population. In terms of ancestry, 53.0% were German, 12.6% were Irish, 8.9% were American, and 8.0% were English.

Of the 17,972 households, 32.8% had children under the age of 18 living with them, 57.9% were married couples living together, 8.5% had a female householder with no husband present, 29.1% were non-families, and 25.3% of all households were made up of individuals. The average household size was 2.53 and the average family size was 3.02. The median age was 40.0 years.

The median income for a household in the county was $52,018 and the median income for a family was $60,318. Males had a median income of $44,267 versus $30,591 for females. The per capita income for the county was $25,290. About 5.8% of families and 7.2% of the population were below the poverty line, including 9.5% of those under age 18 and 4.6% of those age 65 or over.

Politics
Prior to 1920, Auglaize County consistently voted for Democratic candidates in presidential elections. Since 1920, Democrats have won the county three times in presidential elections, all in years where the party won nationally by a landslide.

|}

Government

Auglaize County is governed by an elected Board of Commissioners.

Courthouse
The county's first courthouse, built in 1851 for $11,499, was in use until 1894, when the current courthouse opened. Occupying an entire city block, the courthouse and its adjacent powerhouse cost $259,481. Some 85 men took 18 months to construct it, starting on July 2, 1893. Built of Berea sandstone with tile floors, the courthouse was highly fire-resistant. The boilers for heating and power generation, a significant cause of fire at the time, were in a separate powerhouse. Steam-driven dynamos produced the electricity that, along with steam for heating and hot water, was fed to the building via an underground conduit. The courthouse marked its centennial in 1994, and remains the seat of the county's courts, along with the much newer West Municipal Court in St. Mary's.

Economy

Auglaize County's economy is based on manufacturing. Employers with more than 400 employees are Crown Equipment Corporation, Joint Township District Memorial Hospital, the Minster Machine Company, Setex, Inc, AAP-St. Mary's Corporation (a division of Hitachi Metals), Veyance Technologies, Inc (Goodyear Tire and Rubber Company), and the Dannon Company.

Communities

Cities
Saint Marys
Wapakoneta (county seat)

Villages

Buckland
Cridersville
Minster (part)
New Bremen
New Knoxville
Waynesfield

Townships

Clay
Duchouquet
German
Goshen
Jackson
Logan
Moulton
Noble
Pusheta
Saint Marys
Salem
Union
Washington
Wayne

https://web.archive.org/web/20160715023447/http://www.ohiotownships.org/township-websites

Census-designated places
New Hampshire
Saint Johns
Uniopolis

Unincorporated communities

Bulkhead
Egypt
Fryburg
Geyer
Glynwood
Gutman
Holden
Kossuth
Lock Two
Moulton
Santa Fe
Slater
Villa Nova

See also
National Register of Historic Places listings in Auglaize County, Ohio

References

Auglaize County Engineer's Office. Official Highway Map 2004. Wapakoneta, Ohio: The Office, 2004.

External links

Official Auglaize County website
Auglaize County Historical Society
Auglaize and Mercer County Convention and Visitor's Bureau

 
1848 establishments in Ohio
Populated places established in 1848
Micropolitan areas of Ohio